Sandra M. Swain (born 1954) is an American oncologist, breast cancer specialist and clinical translational researcher. She is currently a professor of Medicine at the Georgetown University School of Medicine and the Associate Dean for Research Development at Georgetown University Medical Center (GUMC) and MedStar Health as well as an adjunct professor of Medicine at the F. Edward Hébert School of Medicine of the Uniformed Services University of Health Sciences. She is also a past President of the American Society of Clinical Oncology (ASCO), serving from 2012 through 2013.

The focus of Sandra's research includes clinical trials and translational research in metastatic and inflammatory breast cancer, adjuvant treatment of breast cancer, the treatments of metastatic HER2+ breast cancer, cardiotoxicity, as well as health care disparities.,, She has authored more than 275 articles on her research in multiple medical journals, including the New England Journal of Medicine (NEJM) and the Journal of Clinical Oncology (JCO). In addition, she has been interviewed in The New York Times and The Wall Street Journal, as well as on NPR's Weekend Edition Sunday and the PBS NewsHour.

Career
After completing her fellowship at the NCI and running clinical trials for two years under Dr. Marc Lippman and alongside Dr. Robert Dickson, Swain founded the breast cancer program at  Georgetown University's Lombardi Comprehensive Cancer Center (LCCC) in 1988. This program is now known as the Betty Lou Ourisman Breast Health Center. She returned to the NCI in 1995 and, by 1999, became a Tenured Principal Investigator and the Deputy Chief of the Medicine Branch within the Division of Clinical Sciences, ultimately becoming Chief of the Cancer Therapeutics Branch at the Center for Cancer Research.

In 2007, after a 12-year stint at the NCI, Swain accepted the position of Medical Director at the  Washington Cancer Institute (WCI) at the  MedStar Washington Hospital Center (MWHC)., At this time, Swain had a growing interest in healthcare inequality and a desire to dedicate her efforts to the underserved African American community in Washington, D.C. During her time as medical director at the WCI, she studied the causes of increased breast cancer mortality observed in African American women. In 2016, after almost a decade at the WCI, Swain was appointed as the Associate Dean for Research Development to pursue research collaborations, business development, and funding opportunities between Georgetown University and industry, medical/scientific associations, governmental agencies, and other entities at all levels.

Over the past 35 years, Swain has held advisory and leadership positions with professional oncology societies and organizations. These include Susan G. Komen for the Cure, the American Society of Clinical Oncology, the Conquer Cancer Foundation, the National Surgical Adjuvant Breast and Bowel Project (NSABP), and the National Accreditation Program for Breast Centers. Swain is a national past-President of the  American Society of Clinical Oncology (ASCO) serving from 2012 through 2013.,,, She currently serves as the Secretary for ASCO's Conquer Cancer Foundation.

Bibliography

References

Scientists from Washington, D.C.
American oncologists
Women oncologists
American women physicians
American women scientists
Living people
Breast cancer
Cancer researchers
1954 births
American medical researchers
Georgetown University Medical Center faculty
Uniformed Services University of the Health Sciences faculty
University of North Carolina at Chapel Hill alumni
University of Florida College of Medicine alumni
American women academics
21st-century American women